Allardville (2006 population: 2,151) is a Canadian rural community in Gloucester County, New Brunswick.  The community is centred on the intersection of Route 134, Route 160 and Route 360 and is part of the local service district of Allardville, which includes several other communities.

Located south of Bathurst, the community is named for Monsignor Jean Joseph August Allard (1884-1971), founder of the local mission in the 1930s.

History

Education

Provincial public school systems 

École François-Xavier-Daigle

Notable people

References

Communities in Gloucester County, New Brunswick
Local service districts of Gloucester County, New Brunswick